Zvyagintsevo , rural localities in Russia, may refer to:

 Zvyagintsevo, Kaliningrad Oblast, a settlement
 Zvyagintsevo, Kursky District, Kursk Oblast, a village

 Zvyagintsevo, Vyshnereutchansky Selsoviet, Medvensky District, Kursk Oblast, a khutor
 Zvyagintsevo, Vysoksky Selsoviet, Medvensky District, Kursk Oblast, a village
 Zvyagintsevo, Oryol Oblast, a village

 See also
 Zvyagintsev